The Hubbard Rice Dryer is a historic rice processing facility at 15015 Senteney Road (Poinsett County Road 624), about  northeast of Weiner, Arkansas.  It consists of ten concrete silos  in height, arranged in pairs retreating from the roadway, which passes to the south of the facility.  In the interior spaces between these concrete silos are five metal silos,  in height.  Large metal pipes protrude from the east and west side of the structure.  Each silo is mounted on a concrete ring, most of which have doorways providing access into the facility's substructure, which facilitates movement between the silos.  Built c. 1945, it is a well-preserved example of a period rice dryer.  It was last used in 1979, and has stood vacant since then.

The property was listed on the National Register of Historic Places in 2004.

See also
Tichnor Rice Dryer and Storage Building
National Register of Historic Places listings in Poinsett County, Arkansas

References

Agricultural buildings and structures on the National Register of Historic Places in Arkansas
Buildings and structures completed in 1945
Buildings and structures in Poinsett County, Arkansas
National Register of Historic Places in Poinsett County, Arkansas